City Montessori School, Station Road Branch  is a private school in Lucknow, India that offers education up to the intermediate level. It is a co-educational, English Medium institution affiliated to ICSE Board, New Delhi. It was established in 1959. The streams offered are Science, Commerce and Arts.

History
The school was established in 1959. During its initial years it was affiliated to the U.P. Board. It became an ICSE school in 1987 and an ISC school in 1989. Previous principals were Mrs Nasir, Mrs Garg, Ms Manjit Batra, Mrs D. Vivek.

Organization 
CMS Asharfabad comprises four sections:

The Pre-Primary Section
CMS has adopted the Montessori method of preschool education. The Pre-Primary section admits boys and girls between the ages of 2 and 5 as follows:
 Montessori: 2 to 3 years of age (Play Group)
 Nursery: 4 years of age
 Kindergarten: 5 to 6 years of age

The Primary Section
The Primary Section consist of Grades I-V.

The Junior Section
The Junior Section consists of Grades VI-VIII.

The Senior Section
The Senior Section consists of Grades IX-XII.

Traditions

Morning prayer assembly
Students participate in morning assembly, held in the school's auditorium and lasting about half an hour. It consists of the recital of devotional songs and prayers. A group of students conducts the assembly and presents virtue-talks and inspiring speeches and stories as well. There are discussions on how to bring about world peace.

Class presentations
Class presentations showcase individual talent. Every child of the class gets an opportunity to face an audience in a 2-2½ hour long ensemble of dances, songs, cultural presentations, skits and debates.

Enrichment classes 
With the aim of adapting the curriculum to individual needs the school runs enrichment classes. These are held after school hours and consist of small groups where discussion, problem-solving, reinforcement of learning and close teacher student interaction takes place.

Student Council
To develop leadership qualities and a sense of responsibility in children the school has a head boy/head girl, captains, vice captains and prefects who are responsible for discipline, neatness and organization of functions.

Extracurricular activities
The school organizes a computer event COFAS International and International Youth Conference on Commerce and Economics.

References

External links 
 Facebook

Montessori schools in India
Primary schools in Uttar Pradesh
High schools and secondary schools in Uttar Pradesh
Private schools in Lucknow
Educational institutions established in 1959
1959 establishments in Uttar Pradesh